Eddy Baker (born August 18, 1991) is an American rapper, singer, and songwriter from Ontario, California. In 2011, he joined Raider Klan, the underground rap supergroup that popularized Phonk, a demonic breed of trap inspired by 90s Memphis-rap, horrorcore, and niche internet phenomena. In 2012, Baker released Edibles, his first mixtape, under Raider Klan Records. The following year, he performed at Coachella as a part of Raider Klan. Months later, Baker left the group and started Healthy Boyz alongside rappers Chilly Sosa and Celes Karter. In 2014, Healthy Boyz joined a four-crew supergroup, Seshollowaterboyz (abbreviated as SHWB), with Bones' TeamSESH, Xavier Wulf's Hollow Squad, and Chris Travis' Water Boyz. SHWB toured and released music regularly until 2020, when COVID-19 forced a global suspension of in-person concerts and Chris Travis (along with Water Boyz, his subsidiary) parted ways with the larger group. In May of 2020, Eddy Baker started Blunt Talk, a podcast with co-host Chilly Sosa about current events and spirituality.

Discography

Mixtapes 

 Edibles (2012)
 BADGUY (2014)
 On Call (2014)
 Growhouse (2014)
 BADGUY 2 (2014)
 Drug Dealer Music: Part One (2015)
 Most Hated (2015)
 Street Love (2015)
 BADGUY 3 (2015)
 Less Than Zero (2016)
 DRUG DEALER SUPERSTAR (2017)
 VIGILANTE (2018)
 I GOT HIGH AS F*** & FORGOT I MADE THESE SONGS (SIDE A) (2019)
 I GOT HIGH AS F*** & FORGOT I MADE THESE SONGS (SIDE B) (2019)
 The Worst of Times (EP) (2020)

EPs 

 The Saul Silver EP (2012 )
 The Eduardo Baker EP (2014)
 Grey Sweatpants EP (2014)
 No Sleep (2015)
 Healthy Boy (2017)
 Hierba y Dinero (2017)
 I HOPE THIS HELPS (2019)
 NO REST FOR THE WICKED (2019)
 THE WORST OF TIMES (2020)

Collaborative albums 

 Bones & Eddy Baker - SparrowsCreek (2019)

Collaborative EPs 

 Eddy Baker & Celes Karter - Stepbrothers  (2021)
 Eddy Baker & Yung Cortex - Ill Sleeep When Im Dead EP (2021 )
 Black Smurf & Eddy Baker - Criminal Minds (2014)
 Eddy Baker & OmenXIII - SUPERHOT (2018)
 Idontknowjeffery & Eddy Baker -Bad Boys II'' (2021)

Guest appearances

References 

1991 births
Rappers from California
Living people
People from Ontario, California